Jaborosa is a genus of flowering plants in the family Solanaceae, the nightshades. There are about 23 species, all native to South America, where they are distributed from Peru to Patagonia. Most occur in the Andes. Most can be found in Argentina and ten are endemic to the country.

Description
Most Jaborosa are rhizomatous perennial herbs except J. bergii and J. sativa, which are annual or biennial.

Ecology
J. rotacea is pollinated by flies, and J. runcinata is pollinated by moths. Sphingid moths feed on the nectar of J. integrifolia.

Chemistry
Like plants in several other Solanaceae genera, many Jaborosa species contain steroid-derived compounds called withanolides. Many of the withanolides isolated from Jaborosa have been dubbed jaborosalactones. Some withanolides are phytotoxic, having effects on other plants such as inhibiting germination and radicle growth. Some have antifeedant effects, deterring insects such as mealworms (Tenebrio molitor), the Mediterranean fruit fly (Ceratitis capitata), and the African cotton leafworm (Spodoptera littoralis) from consuming the plant.

Diversity
Species include:
Jaborosa ameghinoi 
Jaborosa araucana
Jaborosa bergii
Jaborosa cabrerae
Jaborosa caulescens
Jaborosa chubutensis
Jaborosa integrifolia
Jaborosa kurtzii
Jaborosa lanigera
Jaborosa leucotricha
Jaborosa magellanica
Jaborosa odonelliana
Jaborosa oxipetala
Jaborosa parviflora
Jaborosa pinnata
Jaborosa reflexa
Jaborosa riojana
Jaborosa rotacea
Jaborosa runcinata
Jaborosa sativa
Jaborosa squarrosa
Jaborosa volkmannii

References

Solanoideae
Solanaceae genera
Flora of South America